"Boy Meets Girl" (stylized as "BOY MEETS GIRL") is a song by Japanese band TRF. The song was released on June 22, 1994 as their seventh single.

Background and release

"Boy Meets Girl" was written and produced by Tetsuya Komuro. It is inspired by Eurobeat music, and it is composed of synths at 135 BPM. The song was featured in a Coca-Cola commercial. The single was first released on June 22, 1994, and then re-released on November 29, 2006. The fourth track on the single, "Boy Meets Girl (Twilight Mix "Tribute to Ayrton Senna")", is a tribute to Ayrton Senna after his death in 1994.

Reception
"Boy Meets Girl" peaked at #3 on Oricon Weekly Singles Chart. The song is one of TRF and Tetsuya Komuro's most identifiable songs and is credited for being one of the first to introduce the Japanese public to dance music.

Track listing

In popular culture

A remix titled "Boy Meets Girl (Da! Da! Da! Remix)" was featured as the ending theme to the 2000 anime series UFO Baby. The single was released on August 23, 2000.

Cover versions

The song was covered by World Order on their self-titled debut album.

Pretty Rhythm versions

Japanese girl group Prizmmy released a cover of "EZ Do Dance" as their 8th single on July 24, 2013 in collaboration between Avex Pictures and the Pretty Rhythm franchise to honor TRF's 20th anniversary. The song served as the first opening theme song to the anime series Pretty Rhythm: Rainbow Live. The single charted at #79 on the Oricon Weekly Singles Chart.

Over the Rainbow, side characters from Pretty Rhythm: Rainbow Live, also provided a cover of "Boy Meets Girl" on their first album. The song was performed by the characters Kouji Mihama (voiced by Tetsuya Kakihara), Hiro Hayami (voiced by Tomoaki Maeno), and Kazuki Nishina (voiced by Toshiki Masuda). The song was also performed by Koji Kominami, Taishi Sugie, Takuto Omi in the stage play adaptation, King of Prism: Over the Sunshine!

References

1994 singles
TRF (group) songs
Anime songs
Avex Group singles
Japanese-language songs
Pretty Rhythm
Songs written by Tetsuya Komuro
Animated series theme songs